Mid Glamorgan County Council was the upper-tier authority for the Welsh county of Mid Glamorgan between its creation in 1974 and its abolition in 1996.

History
Local government in England and Wales was reorganised in 1974 under the Local Government Act 1972. The old administrative county of Glamorgan was subdivided, forming Mid Glamorgan, South Glamorgan and West Glamorgan, which all came into existence on 1 April 1974.

Mid Glamorgan was the largest and the poorest of the new county councils in Glamorgan. In 1974 it had a population of 531,847 and the council had a revenue expenditure of £60 million.

Mid Glamorgan County Council was abolished in 1996 under the Local Government (Wales) Act 1994, with the districts in the area being reorganised to become unitary authorities taking over the functions previously performed by the county council.

Political control
The first election to the county council was held in 1973, initially operating as a shadow authority alongside the outgoing authorities until it came into its powers on 1 April 1974. Labour held a majority of the seats on the council throughout its existence.

Leadership
The leaders of the council were:

Philip Squire was appointed chairman and leader from the establishment of the shadow authority. He had previously been a member of Glamorgan County Council since 1946. The chief executive was solicitor, Tom Vivian Walters, who had worked for Glamorgan County Council since 1943.

Squire continued as leader of the council for 15 years, until retiring in 1989 at the age of 83. Because of the dominance of the Labour Party on the council, it was sometimes referred to as a "Squirearchy".

Elections
The first Mid Glamorgan Council elections took place in April 1973, when 85 councillors were elected from 68 electoral divisions (with 16 councillors in 14 divisions being elected unopposed). The number of councillors was reduced to 74 in 1989. The results of each election were as follows:

Premises
County Hall (now the Glamorgan Building) in Cathays Park, Cardiff had been the headquarters for Glamorgan County Council prior to 1974 and, although Cardiff was in South Glamorgan, not Mid Glamorgan, it was decided to use the Glamorgan Building as the new headquarters for Mid Glamorgan County Council.

See also
 List of electoral wards in Mid Glamorgan

References

Mid Glamorgan
County councils of Wales
1974 establishments in Wales
1996 disestablishments in Wales